Carroll Dudley Kearns (May 7, 1900 – June 11, 1976) was a Republican member of the U.S. House of Representatives from Pennsylvania.

Biography
Kearns was born in Youngstown, Ohio, the son of Patrick Henry and Ida May (née Carroll) Kearns. He moved with his parents to New Castle, PA, in 1901.  He was a student in the Army Reserve Officers' Training Corps at the University of Pittsburgh in 1918, at the Chicago Musical College in Chicago, receiving a B.M. in 1921 and D.M. in 1948.  He also received a B.S. from Westminster College in New Wilmington, PA, in 1933, and an M.E. from the University of Pittsburgh, in 1938.  He took special studies at Penn State College at State College, PA in 1932 and 1933.  He was engaged in the construction business in Chicago from 1925 through 1929.  He taught school and engaged in educational work in supervisory and administrative positions in Illinois and Pennsylvania from 1924 through 1947, and also pursued a musical career as a concert artist and conductor.

He married Nora Mary Lynch in New Castle on August 30, 1933.

He was elected as a Republican to the Eightieth and to the seven succeeding Congresses.  He served as the ranking minority member on the United States House Committee on Education and Labor during the 86th and 87th Congresses.  He was an unsuccessful candidate for renomination in 1962.  after his time in Congress he became engaged in manufacturing from 1963 to 1970. Kearns voted in favor of the Civil Rights Acts of 1957 and 1960, but voted present on the 24th Amendment to the U.S. Constitution.

References

Sources

1900 births
1976 deaths
Westminster College (Pennsylvania) alumni
University of Pittsburgh alumni
Pennsylvania State University alumni
American Lutherans
Politicians from Pittsburgh
Republican Party members of the United States House of Representatives from Pennsylvania
20th-century American politicians
20th-century Lutherans